The Women's Baseball World Cup is an international tournament in which national women's baseball teams from around the world compete. Through its 2012 edition, it was sanctioned by the International Baseball Federation; following the 2013 merger of the IBAF with the International Softball Federation, subsequent tournaments are sanctioned by the World Baseball Softball Confederation (WBSC). In the eight times it has been held, the tournament has been won twice by the United States and six consecutive times by Japan in 2008, 2010, 2012, 2014, 2016 and 2018.

History
Before this tournament the only other international women's baseball tournament was the Women's Baseball World Series, which usually involved only three or four nations, usually Australia, Canada, Japan and occasionally the USA.

Competition format
All competing nations played one game versus each opponent. The top four teams advanced to the semifinals. Ties in standings were broken by head-to-head record. The first place team played versus the fourth place team and the second place team played the third place team. The semifinal losers then played the bronze medal game, with the winner earning third place and the loser receiving fourth place. The semifinal winners played in the finals, with the winner earning first place and the loser receiving second place. All regulation games are seven innings in length with the exception of the mercy rule, which applied to a ten run lead after 5 innings or a twelve run lead after 4 innings.

Results

Notes

Future
The next World Cup is expected in 2024.

Medal table

Participating nations

See also
Baseball awards#World

References

 
Cup, Women's
Recurring sporting events established in 2004
World Baseball Softball Confederation competitions
World Cup